Edgefield is a village and a civil parish in the English county of Norfolk.

History
Edgefield's name is of Anglo-Saxon origin and derives from the Old English for an enclosed area of parkland.

In the Domesday Book, Edgefield is listed as a settlement of 36 households in the hundred of Holt. In 1086, the village was divided between the East Anglian estates of Peter de Valognes and Ranulf, brother of Ilger.

During the Second World War, defensive emplacements including a mortar battery and searchlight were built in Edgefield in preparation for a potential German invasion of Great Britain.

Geography
According to the 2011 Census, Edgefield has a population of 385 residents living in 208 households.

Edgefield falls within the constituency of North Norfolk and is represented at Parliament by Duncan Baker MP of the Conservative Party. For the purposes of local government, the parish falls within the district of North Norfolk.

Church of St. Peter and St. Paul
Edgefield's parish church was rebuilt in the late-Nineteenth Century in the Perpendicular style from the remains of an earlier Medieval church under the leadership of J.D. Sedding and Rev. Walter Macron. The church also possesses good examples of Twentieth Century stained glass by John Hayward and a font made from Purbeck Marble and dating from the Thirteenth Century. Rev. Marcon is commemorated in the church where he is depicted riding his bicycle in a stained-glass window, which also commemorates the building of the church.  The 13th century tower from the Medieval church still stands in a farmyard on the road to Hunworth. It is octagonal in shape and built from flint and carrstone. The remnants and tower of the old church were renovated with grants from English Heritage in 1981. The rector and P.C.C. still have the responsibility for the tower, while responsibility for the churchyard has been passed to the civil authorities.

Transport
The nearest railway station is at Sheringham for the Bittern Line which runs between Sheringham and Norwich. The nearest airport is Norwich International Airport. The village is situated on the B1149 between Norwich and Holt road.

Amenities
The village public house is called 'The Pigs' and has stood on the site since 1744 under various names. In its history, the pub has operated under the ownership of the Coltishall Brewery, Brereton's of Letheringsett, Bullard's of Norwich, Watney Mann Ltd. and now operates as a freehouse. In the mid-Nineteenth Century, Piggs Inn (as it was then called) was involved in the smuggling of spirits led by landlord James Dyball.

Edgefield School dates from the Nineteenth Century and was enlarged in 1878. The school building was closed in 1900 with local children being educated at what is now the village hall.

Edgefield is also home to RMC Autos, a car garage.

Notable Residents
 Rev. Walter Marcon (1824-1875)- English cleric, cricketer and Rector of Edgefield

War Memorial
Edgefield's war memorial originally stood as an obelisk on the village green but by the early Twenty-first Century this had fallen into disrepair. As a result, a new memorial was built on the village green at the cost of £1,968 and subsequently unveiled on the 11 November 2004. The memorial lists the following names for the First World War:
 Pvt. Charles R. Peck (1881-1917), 1st Battalion, Essex Regiment
 Pvt. Thomas Fabb (1899-1918), 4th Battalion, Middlesex Regiment
 Pvt. Percy H. Coleman (1900-1918), 7th Battalion, Royal Norfolk Regiment
 Pvt. George E. Jacobs (1896-1916), 8th Battalion, Royal Norfolk Regiment
 Pvt. Percy H. Peck (1898-1918), 7th (Service) Battalion, York and Lancaster Regiment

Gallery

References

Further reading
 Mee, A. (1972). The King's England: Norfolk. London:Hodder and Stoughton. , p.85.
 Pevsner, N. (1962). Buildings of England: Norfolk I: Norwich and North-East. London: Yale University Press. .

External links

Villages in Norfolk
North Norfolk
Civil parishes in Norfolk